George Richardson may refer to:

Military figures
 Sir George Richardson (Indian Army officer) (1847–1931), British military officer and commander of the Ulster Volunteers
 George Richardson (VC) (1831–1923), Irish Victoria Cross winner
 Sir George Spafford Richardson (1868–1938), New Zealand military leader and administrator, and local body politician in Auckland

Politicians
 George Richardson (Canadian politician) (1916–2000), Canadian politician
 George Richardson (New Zealand politician) (1837–1909), New Zealand politician
 George F. Richardson (1850–1923), U.S. Representative from Michigan
 George C. Richardson (1808–1886), mayor of Cambridge, Massachusetts
 George W. Richardson (1829–1886), American politician in Massachusetts
 George Francis Richardson (1829–1912), American lawyer and politician in Massachusetts
 George W. Richardson (Maryland politician) (died 1930), American politician in Maryland
 George L. Richardson, member of the Virginia House of Delegates

Sportspeople
 George Richardson (cricketer) (1834–1911), Australian cricketer
 George H. Richardson (died 1948), owner of the Washington Senators, 1920–1949
 George Richardson (baseball), Negro league baseball player, 1901–1903
 George Richardson (ice hockey) (1886–1916), Canadian ice hockey player
 George Richardson (footballer, born 1891) (1891–?), English football outside right who played for Huddersfield Town and others
 George Richardson (footballer, born 1899) (1899–1963), Scottish football wing half who played for Lincoln City, Sheffield United and Boscombe
 George Richardson (footballer, born 1901) (1901–?), English football left half or forward who played for Hartlepools United and Newport County
 George Richardson (footballer, born 1912) (1912–1968), English football inside forward who played for Sheffield United, Hull City, and Bangor City

Other people
 Geordie Richardson (1835–1905), New Zealand merchant and ship owner with the full name of George Edward Gordon Richardson
 George Richardson (architect) (1737/8–c. 1813), Scottish architect and writer
 George Barclay Richardson (1924–2019), British economist and Warden of Keble College, Oxford
 George Burr Richardson (1872–1949), geologist
 George S. Richardson (engineer) (1896–1988), American engineer and bridge designer